The Turbhorn is a mountain of the Lepontine Alps, located in the canton of Valais south of the Blinnenhorn. The border with Italy runs less than one km east of the summit.

References

External links
Turbhorn on Hikr

Mountains of the Alps
Alpine three-thousanders
Mountains of Switzerland
Mountains of Valais
Lepontine Alps